The New Hampshire Division of Parks and Recreation is responsible for the management of state parks within New Hampshire, the Cannon Mountain Ski Area, the Bureau of Trails, the Bureau of Historic Sites, and various community programs. Philip A. Bryce is director of the division. Since 2017, the division's parent agency has been the New Hampshire Department of Natural and Cultural Resources (DNCR).

Projects include study and development of the Temple Mountain Ski Area, acquired by the state in 2007, slated to become a state park.

See also
List of New Hampshire state parks

References

External links
NH Division of Parks and Recreation official website

Parks and Recreation
 
Government agencies established in 1935
1935 establishments in New Hampshire